Marvin Harold Anderson (March 3, 1918 – February 13, 1998) was an American businessman and politician.

Anderson was born in Minneapolis, Minnesota and graduated from Roosevelt High School in Minneapolis. Anderson served in the United States Army during World War II. He lived in Minneapolis with his wife and family and was a building contractor. Anderson served in the Minnesota Senate from 1947 to 1958. He then lived in Bloomington, Minnesota. Anderson died in Bradenton, Florida.

References

1918 births
1998 deaths
Businesspeople from Minneapolis
Military personnel from Minneapolis
Politicians from Minneapolis
People from Bloomington, Minnesota
Minnesota state senators